Anne, Lady Beechey (born Anne Phyllis Jessop; 3 August 1764 – 14 December 1833) was a British portrait painter.

Life

Beechey was born in Thorpe St Andrew near Norfolk in 1764 as Anne Phyllis Jessop. She developed a successful portrait business and she met William Beechey who was also a painter. William was in Norwich between 1782 and 1787 and it presumed they met at that time. In 1787 she exhibited works at the Royal Academy as "Miss A. P. Jessup"(sic).

William was a widower in 1793 with five children after his first wife, Mary Ann, died. Beechey and Jessop wed in 1793. She continued to exhibit at the Royal Academy from 1795 to 1805. She used the name Mrs Beechey until 1799, when she became Lady Beechey.

Children
Anne Phyllis Beechey (1794–December 1883)
Frederick William Beechey (1796–1856), Royal Navy captain, geographer, politician
George Duncan Beechey (1798–1852), painter
  Anna Dodsworth Beechey (born 1800)
William Nelson Beechey (3 August 1801 – 1 August 1878)
Charlotte Earl Beechey (3 August 1801 – 28 November 1849)
Alfred Beechey (born 24 June 1803)
St. Vincent Beechey (1806–1899), clergyman
Richard Brydges Beechey (1808–1895), painter and admiral in the British navy
Jane Henrietta Frances Beechy (born 19 December 1809)

Their children included a high number of notable painters. Beechey died in Harley Street.

References 

1764 births
1833 deaths
People from Thorpe St Andrew
British portrait painters
British women painters
Wives of knights